Ainsley Edward Armstrong (born 27 December 1952) is a Trinidad and Tobago sprinter. He competed in the 100 metres at the 1972 Summer Olympics and the 1976 Summer Olympics.

References

External links
 

1952 births
Living people
Athletes (track and field) at the 1972 Summer Olympics
Athletes (track and field) at the 1976 Summer Olympics
Trinidad and Tobago male sprinters
Olympic athletes of Trinidad and Tobago